The Caddon Water is a small river by the village of Caddonfoot, in the Scottish Borders area of Scotland. It rises on Windlestraw Law, four miles north of Innerleithen, and flows through the Stantling Craig Reservoir. It joins the river Tweed at Caddonfoot, having completed its journey after 11 miles (18 km).

Etymology
The name Caddon, recorded as Kaledene in 1296, has a Brittonic origin. The second part of the name is the nominal or locative suffix -onā. The first element may be *calet, which survives in Welsh as caled meaning "hard". An initial element of cad meaning "a battle", is also a possibility.

See also
List of places in the Scottish Borders
List of places in Scotland

References

External links
RCAHMS record for Caddon Water
Roman Communications in the Tweed Valley
Gazetteer for Scotland: Caddon Water
Scottish Environment Protection Agency (SEPA) River Tweed Catchment Pollution Reduction Programme
Scottish Borders Council: Local Plan: water and Drainage, Caddon Water
Southern Reporter, September 2009: "No quick fix for village sewer issue"
GEOGRAPH image: Footbridge over Caddon Water

Rivers of the Scottish Borders